Joan Bramsch (February 25, 1936 – March 29, 2009), was an American entrepreneur, teacher, and romance writer. Her published work includes six romance novels and a non-fiction book about homeschooling.

Born in St. Louis in 1936, the daughter of  Melvin J. and Margaret Schlanger, she worked as a teletype and radio operator for Delta Air Lines in 1953 and 1954. In 1954, she married William E. Bramsch, an engineer. The couple had five children.

A partner at Gee-Bee Specialties and a free-lance designer from 1970 through 1978, she tutored at private and public schools in St. Louis, Missouri, from 1976 through 1982 and started a business, Liberty Communications House, in 1979. Bramsch attended Washington University in St. Louis, completing an associate of arts degree in 1979, a Bachelor of Science (B.S.) in English in 1982, and a B.S. in communications and journalism in 1984. She contributed to periodicals and was the newsletter editor for Romance Writers of America from 1984 through 1986.

Bramsch died on March 29, 2009, in St. Louis.

Bibliography

Nonfiction
 Teach Me, I'm Yours (nonfiction) (1979)

Romance novels
 The Sophisticated Mountain Gal (1984) 
 A Kiss to Make It Better (1984) 
 The Light Side (1985) 
 At Nightfall (1985) 
 The Stallion Man  1985 
 With No Reservations (1987)

References

1936 births
2009 deaths
20th-century American women writers
Writers from St. Louis
Washington University in St. Louis alumni
American romantic fiction writers
20th-century American businesspeople
Schoolteachers from Missouri
American women educators